Mellenbach-Glasbach is a village and a former municipality in the district Saalfeld-Rudolstadt, in Thuringia, Germany. Since 1 January 2019, it is part of the town Schwarzatal.

References

Former municipalities in Thuringia
Saalfeld-Rudolstadt